Alexandros Ioannis "AJ" Ginnis (born 17 November 1994) is a Greek-American World Cup alpine ski racer. Ginnis specializes in the technical events, with a focus on slalom. He made his World Cup debut in December 2014 and gained his first podium in February 2023. He then won the silver medal in the 2023 World Championships.

Early life
Born in Athens, Greece, Alexandros Ioannis Ginnis grew up in the seaside suburb Vouliagmeni. His father ran a ski school and that was where he met his American wife. Alexandros started skiing at age two at Mt. Parnassus. When he was twelve, the family moved to Austria. It was then that the young skier decided to make his fun pastime a potential career. Ginnis was fifteen when his family moved to the United States, where he enrolled at the Green Mountain Valley School in Vermont. Two years later, he became a member of the U.S. Ski Team.

Career
At age seventeen, Ginnis was named to the U.S. Ski Team in the spring of 2012. After tearing his ACL that following season, he was able to climb the ranks and made his World Cup debut on 22 December 2014 in a slalom at Madonna di Campiglio, Italy. Later that season, Ginnis won the bronze medal in the slalom at the Junior World Championships in Hafjell, Norway, and continued to climb the ranks by securing podiums and wins at Europa Cup, NorAm, and national championship events.

On 22 December 2016, Ginnis scored his first World Cup points, finishing 26th in the slalom at Madonna di Campiglio. During that 2017 season, he qualified to represent Team USA at the World Championships in St. Moritz, Switzerland.

His career has been plagued by injuries, as he has received more than five surgeries on the same knee. Knee injuries kept him sidelined during the 2018 and 2019 seasons. In the 2020 season, Ginnis raced for Dartmouth College while re-qualifying for the USA's World Cup team.

On 17 January 2021, Ginnis became the first Greek alpine racer to register World Cup points for Greece, finishing eleventh at a slalom in Flachau, Austria. The Hellenic Olympic team praised him for his great effort and contribution to the sport in Greece and U.S. Ambassador to Greece Geoffrey Pyatt tweeted:

“Athens-born Greek-American AJ Ginnis, skiing for Flag of Greece today became the first ever Greek to win a point scoring position in @fisalpine professional competition!”

Ginnis achieved his first World Cup podium on 4 February 2023 as the runner-up in a slalom at Chamonix, France. With his second-place finish, Ginnis became the first Greek skier in history to secure a podium position in a World Cup alpine ski race. Two weeks later at the World Championships in Courchevel, he was the silver medalist in the slalom.

World Cup results

Season standings

Race podiums
 0 wins 
 1 podium – (1 SL); 3 top twenties (3 SL)

World Championship results

References

External links

1994 births
Living people
American male alpine skiers
Greek male alpine skiers
Sportspeople from Athens